Beaver Mill is a historic grist mill located near Craigsville, Nicholas County, West Virginia.  It was built in 1852, and is a two-story, clapboard-sided, timber-frame structure with an end gable roof. It sits on a stone pier foundation, and measures 25 feet wide and 30 feet, one inch deep. The mill ceased operation in 1932.

It was listed on the National Register of Historic Places in 2001.

References

Grinding mills on the National Register of Historic Places in West Virginia
Industrial buildings completed in 1852
Buildings and structures in Nicholas County, West Virginia
Grinding mills in West Virginia
National Register of Historic Places in Nicholas County, West Virginia
1852 establishments in Virginia